Colin James Alcide (born 14 April 1972) is an English former professional footballer.

He was a striker from 1991 until 2004 and made more than 200 appearances in the Football League playing for Lincoln City, Hull City, York City, Cambridge United and Exeter City. Alcide played non-League football for Emley, Altrincham, Gainsborough Trinity and Ashton United with a spell in Wales with TNS.

Career
Alcide began his career in local football before joining Emley. In the middle of 1992, following just one season with Emley, he followed his manager Gerry Quinn across the pennines to Altrincham. He then returned to Emley before signing for Lincoln City and beginning his Football League career. In 1998, he formed a strike partnership with Leo Fortune-West. Alcide moved to Hull City in 1999. In 2001, he joined Cambridge United. At Cambridge he scored once in the League Cup against West Bromwich Albion.

In the middle of 2004, Alcide reappeared in the colours of TNS for whom he appeared against Osters IF in the UEFA Cup but did not remain for the Welsh Premier League season, instead linking up with his former Emley and Altrincham manager Gerry Quinn at Ashton United in Conference North. His spell at Ashton was interrupted by illness and injury, prompting his retirement in October 2004.

Personal life
Alcide now lives in Huddersfield and had continued to play amateur football, notably for Bay Athletic.

References

External links

Unofficial Colin Alcide Profile at The Forgotten Imp

1972 births
Living people
Footballers from Huddersfield
English footballers
Association football forwards
Wakefield F.C. players
Altrincham F.C. players
Lincoln City F.C. players
Hull City A.F.C. players
York City F.C. players
Cambridge United F.C. players
Gainsborough Trinity F.C. players
Exeter City F.C. players
The New Saints F.C. players
Ashton United F.C. players
English Football League players
National League (English football) players